The 2014 FIA WTCC Race of Japan (formally the 2014 FIA WTCC JVC Kenwood Race of Japan) was the eleventh round of the 2014 World Touring Car Championship season and the seventh running of the FIA WTCC Race of Japan. It was held on 26 October 2014 at the Suzuka Circuit in Suzuka City, Japan. This was the first time the race was held on the full Grand Prix layout.

Race one was won by José María López for Citroën Total WTCC and race two was won by Gabriele Tarquini for the Castrol Honda World Touring Car Team. López secured his first World Touring Car Championship drivers' title in race one, becoming the first Argentine driver to win a world drivers' championship since Juan Manuel Fangio in 1957.

Background

López led the drivers' championship coming into the round, ninety–three points ahead of teammate Yvan Muller. Franz Engstler had secured the Yokohama Trophy title at the previous race in Shanghai.

Campos Racing put another different driver in their second TC2 SEAT with Henry Kwong replacing William Lok. Citroën Total WTCC reduced to three cars with Ma Qing Hua not participating in the Japanese round.

Report

Testing and free practice
López set the pace in Friday testing, the session had been stopped briefly following an off for Kwong which left gravel scattered across the track.

Muller was at the top of timing pages in first free practice on Saturday morning, López was second and Gabriele Tarquini's Honda was third.

Muller was quickest ahead of Gianni Morbidelli in free practice two. Dušan Borković hit trouble early on, oversteering into the trackside barriers at turn eight and causing considerable damage to his Chevrolet.

Qualifying
Muller was quickest in the first part of qualifying. The session was interrupted at the halfway stage when Felipe De Souza spun off and beached his Liqui Moly Team Engstler BMW in the gravel. After a brief delay the session resumed with ten minutes remaining, Tom Chilton was quickest early on before López and Muller set their first competitive times. The Ladas waited in the pit lane before going out with Robert Huff in twelfth place in the times. In the final few minutes of the session Norbert Michelisz moved into eleventh place, bumping Huff down and out of a place in Q2.

Muller was quickest once again in the second session ahead of López and Sébastien Loeb, Chilton and Hugo Valente were fourth and fifth. All four Honda drivers missed out on progressing to Q3 but Gabriele Tarquini finished tenth which would put him on pole for race two, Dušan Borković would share the front row with him.

In Q3 López took pole with Muller and Loeb helping Citroën fill the top three places. Chilton and Valente completed the Q3 results.

Race One

López led Muller in the open stages of the race, behind them the battle for third was being contested between Chilton, Valente and Loeb. On lap seven Muller suffered a left-rear puncture and crawled back to the pits to retire, promoting Valente to second. Chilton passed Valente to take second at Spoon Curve on lap ten, Valente then ran wide at 130R which allowed Loeb through and Michelisz ran through the Casio Chicane while he also tried to pass the slow Chevrolet of Valente. After leading every lap, López won the race and secured the drivers' championship title in his first full season. Franz Engstler was the winner in the TC2 class.

Race Two

Tarquini led Borković away from the start, at the end of the first lap Michelisz tapped the back of Borković forcing the Serbian driver to cut the chicane. On the second lap López had a moment at 130R and ran wide as he ran in the slipstream of his Citroën teammates, Loeb ahead of him did the same on the following lap. On lap five Loeb braked too late into the hairpin, at the same time Muller ran into the back of Valente who suffered rear suspension failure in the collision and slowed. As Muller and Loeb slowed, López was able to catch and pass Loeb to move up to sixth place. Borković began to close in on Tarquini in the last few laps but Tarquini held on to take the win with Borković leading Michelisz across the line. John Filippi was the Yokohama Trophy winner for then first time in 2014.

Results

Qualifying

Bold denotes Pole position for second race.

Race 1

Bold denotes Fastest lap.

Race 2

Bold denotes Fastest lap.

Standings after the event

Drivers' Championship standings

Yokohama Trophy standings

Manufacturers' Championship standings

 Note: Only the top five positions are included for both sets of drivers' standings.

References

External links

World Touring Car Championship official website

Japan
FIA WTCC Race of Japan
FIA WTCC Race of Japan